Trouble Maker is an American gasser drag racer, driven to three National Hot Rod Association (NHRA) national AM/SP gasser titles by Joe Lunati.

History 
A Devin powered by a Chevrolet engine, the car was driven to three NHRA national AM/SP gasser titles by Joe Lunati.

Trouble Maker also took Street Eliminator at the event.

In 1965, Trouble Maker again took the AM/SP national title, with a win at the Nationals, held at Indianapolis.

The car was also Street Eliminator winner there that year.

References

Sources
  

Drag racing cars
1970s cars
1960s cars
Rear-wheel-drive vehicles